The Gold Medal is a 1984 Hindi-language spy film, produced by Sham Behl under the Time Films banner and directed by Ravikant Nagaich. It stars Jeetendra, Rakhee Gulzar, Shatrughan Sinha  while Dharmendra in a special appearance. The music was composed by Shankar Jaikishan. Starting from 1969, this movie had faced many types of problems, so it's become a delay released movie and was released in 1984.

Plot
During the investigation of the political murder of labor leader Acharya, Mr. David, the chief of the Secret Services becomes aware of a dangerous organisation working against the national interest. He deputises a promising young officer of his department Gopal to inquire into the activities of the gang and establish the identity of its leader. While Gopal sets out to take down the gang, he falls victim to their vicious plot. Gopal is accused of the murder of Bindu, the dancer at Eagle nightclub and thus has to go underground to save himself from the police. But, Gopal uses this opportunity to infiltrate the gang as a trusted member and unmask the criminal mastermind, and he becomes entangled in a web of deceit and double-cross.

Cast
Dharmendra as Acharya
Jeetendra as Gopal
Rakhee Gulzar as Shobha / Dimple
Shatrughan Sinha as Shatrughan
Premnath as Thakur Ranvir Singh
K. N. Singh as Mr. Singh
David 
Bindu
Jayshree T. as Courtesan
Malti
Faryal
Madhumati

Soundtrack

References

External links 
 

Films scored by Shankar–Jaikishan
1960s Hindi-language films
1960s action films
Films directed by Ravikant Nagaich